Giuseppe Bisi (1787–1869)  was an Italian painter, mainly of landscapes in a Romantic style.

In 1829, he traveled to Rome, and painted landscapes in Lazio. He returned to Milan and in 1838, was named professor of landscape painter for the Accademia di Brera. He was the brother of the painter Michele Bisi,  and married the painter Ernesta Legnani; their daughter Fulvia Bisi trained as a painter with her father. His nephew Luigi became a prominent painter. Among his followers was Roberto Garavaglia (died 1846) and Gaetano Gariboldi (died 1857).

Works
 Veduta del porto di Genoa (1826)
 Veduta di Castel Gandolfo (1830)
 Orlando e Rodomonte
 Landscape with bathers
 Veduta di Torno (1860)

Sources
Opere di G.Bisi
 Milano,Galleria d’Arte Moderna
Derived from Italian Wikipedia site

1787 births
1869 deaths
Painters from Genoa
18th-century Italian painters
Italian male painters
19th-century Italian painters
Academic staff of Brera Academy
Italian vedutisti
19th-century Italian male artists
18th-century Italian male artists